Damien Gregori (also Greg Moffitt) is an Irish musician.

Cradle of Filth
Damien was keyboard player with UK band Cradle of Filth from 1995 to 1997, and appeared on two of the band's albums, V Empire or Dark Faerytales in Phallustein and Dusk and Her Embrace. He left the band in mid-1997.

On the Lovecraft & Witch Hearts compilation CD, he wrote the band's biography in the booklet.

The name 'Damien Gregori' was taken from a Cradle of Filth press release. Throughout his time with the band, Greg was only ever known as 'Damien'.

Rock writer
Greg's career as a rock writer started in 1987 when he published an underground fanzine called A Piss in the Ocean, writing most of the material himself.

Taken from his Myspace page:

"I've been a rock writer since 1987 and have been widely published including appearances in Metal Hammer, Kerrang!, Terrorizer, Decibel, Record Collector, Music Collector, metal-is.com, various Guinness guides and other encyclopaedias and reference works, plus sleeve notes for bands such as Cradle of Filth and Venom. I actually almost completed my book on Venom - 'Sons of Satan' - but it'll never be published; I couldn't get 'them three to meet again'. In thunder, lightning or in rain.
I also played keyboards in Cradle of Filth from 1995 to 1997"

Greg joined the staff of Terrorizer Magazine in 1997, moved to Kerrang! in 2007 and then to Metal Hammer in 2008. He also writes for Decibel magazine.

Radio
In April 2012, Greg began hosting an online radio show at www.legalise-freedom.com

References 
 

Living people
English heavy metal keyboardists
Year of birth missing (living people)
Cradle of Filth members